Toronto shooting may refer to:

 Boxing Day shooting, a gang-related shooting in 2005
 2018 Toronto shooting, a mass shooting in 2018
 Danzig Street shooting, a gang-related shooting in July 2012
 Eaton Centre shooting, a shooting in June 2012
 Shooting of Edmond Yu, a police shooting of a mentally ill man in 1997

See also
 Brampton Centennial Secondary School shooting, Brampton, Greater Toronto, Ontario, Canada; 1975
 Toronto attack (disambiguation)